"My Brave Face" is a single from Paul McCartney's 1989 album, Flowers in the Dirt. Written by McCartney and Elvis Costello, "My Brave Face" is one of the most popular songs from Flowers in the Dirt. It peaked at number 18 in the United Kingdom a week after its debut, and number 25 in the United States. It was McCartney's last top 40 hit on the Billboard Hot 100 until his 2014 collaboration with Kanye West, "Only One", and as of 2022 is the last Billboard top 40 hit with any former Beatle in the lead credit.

Like other songs from Flowers in the Dirt, despite the song's chart success, to date it has not been included on any McCartney compilation album.

Background and recording
"My Brave Face" was first recorded at sessions overseen by McCartney and Costello in early 1988. Excerpts from this session were eventually used in McCartney's documentary video Put It There, but other than that were not used. The final version of the song was recorded later the same year at Olympic Studios in London, with producer Mitchell Froom joining in on the work. During the overdub sessions, David Rhodes added an "EBow guitar" in a quick one-day session at Olympic Studios. According to the Put It There documentary, Costello requested that McCartney bring his iconic Höfner violin bass, which he had not played in years, to the recording session. To this day, Paul still uses this bass, in addition to the Rickenbacker 4001 and his Wal 5-String Customized.

In a 1996 interview, Costello noted the song as an instance where he indulged McCartney's darker side, explaining, "He's thought to be Mr. Sunny but he's got his dark moments, and I like that and really encouraged it. ... People might attribute that to me but he seems to be able to involve that darker side that's there. I haven't got my arm up his back when we're writing. Even 'My Brave Face', which was quite a bright-sounding pop song, is about a guy who's been left by his lover."

Reception
Cash Box said that "there’s a fine driving feel, a brilliantly scripted and melodic B-section-lift to the chorus—in short, a bunch of neat parts. It doesn’t add up as well as some of Paul’s greatest songs, but it’s certainly a muscular tune, enough to whet our appetites for Paul’s upcoming LP 'Flowers in the Dirt.'"

Personnel
Paul McCartney – bass, guitar, tambourine, lead vocals
Linda McCartney – background vocals
Hamish Stuart – guitar, background vocals
Chris Whitten – drums
Robbie McIntosh – guitar
Mitchell Froom – keyboards
David Rhodes – EBow guitar
Chris David – saxophone
Chris White – saxophone
Dave Bishop – saxophone

Track listings 
This song was released on many formats, including the standard 7-inch single, a 12-inch maxi-single, a cassette single, and a CD single.

7-inch single 
A-side: 
"My Brave Face"
B-side: 
"Flying to My Home"

12-inch single 
A-side:
 "My Brave Face"
 "Flying to My Home"

B-side:
 "I'm Gonna Be a Wheel Someday"
 "Ain't That a Shame"

CD single 
 "My Brave Face"
 "Flying to My Home"
 "I'm Gonna Be a Wheel Someday"
 "Ain't That a Shame"

Music video 
The music video for "My Brave Face" was shot in April 1989, directed by Roger Lunn. It was frequently seen on video channels that year, and was released in 2007 on the three disc collection The McCartney Years. It features a Japanese McCartney-fanatic who acquires McCartney memorabilia, films, and audio by means of robbery, and, allegedly, through Sotheby's. The video was shot in both black-and-white and in colour, and it features rare videos of him with The Beatles as well as with Wings. There is a video of him and the rest of the Beatles doing the Charleston, and him and Linda (as well as a visible Joe English in the background) being greeted by people in New Orleans. In the end, the Japanese fanatic gets arrested, and a clip of McCartney looking in the camera is shown, with 2007 McCartney voicing-over on the audio commentary, "What did you expect?" The video earned a nomination in "Best Video" category on the 1990 Brit Awards.

Live performances and cover versions
McCartney included the song on his world tour in 1989–1990; a recording of it is included on the live album Tripping the Live Fantastic. It was also included in some of the small shows McCartney played in 1991. He has not performed the song since.

SR-71 recorded the song for the McCartney tribute album Listen To What The Man Said. Star Collector performed it for another tribute album, Love In Song: An Atlanta Tribute To Sir Paul McCartney.

Charts

Weekly charts

References

Paul McCartney songs
Songs written by Paul McCartney
Songs written by Elvis Costello
1989 songs
Song recordings produced by Paul McCartney
Song recordings produced by Mitchell Froom
Music published by MPL Music Publishing